Tungabhadra Otter Conservation Reserve is the first otter conservation reserve in India, located near Hampi. This is a  stretch along Tungabhadra River. The area is well known for smooth-coated otters and soft-shell turtles.

References

Wildlife sanctuaries of India
Hampi
Otters
Turtle conservation
Vijayanagara district
Protected areas with year of establishment missing